Major General William Alington, 3rd Baron Alington LL (bef. 1641 – 1 February 1685) was an Irish peer.

Alington was the son of William Alington, 1st Baron Alington and Elizabeth Tollemache. He succeeded to the title of 3rd Baron Alington of Killard, Co. Cork circa March 1660, on the death of his brother the 2nd Baron who died without male issue.

In 1664, he was elected Member of Parliament for Cambridge in a by-election to the Cavalier Parliament and was re-elected for the same constituency in 1679 and 1681. He was created 1st Baron Alington of Wymondley, Hertfordshire on 5 December 1682.

He served as Constable of the Tower from 1679 to his death and as Lord-Lieutenant of Cambridgeshire from 1681 to his death.

Private life
He died in 1685, having married three times.

Alington married (1) Catherine Stanhope, daughter of Henry Stanhope, Lord Stanhope, and his wife, Katherine, before 1662.

He married (2) Hon. Juliana Noel, daughter of Baptist Noel, 3rd Viscount Campden, on 30 July 1664.

He married (3) Lady Diana Russell, daughter of William Russell, 1st Duke of Bedford, on 15 July 1675. They had two children.
Hon. Catherine Alington, who married, in 1694, Sir Nathaniel Napier, 3rd Baronet 
Giles Alington, 4th Baron Alington

References

thePeerage.com

17th-century births
1685 deaths
Alington, William Alington, 1st Baron of
Peers of England created by Charles II
Barons in the Peerage of Ireland
Lord-Lieutenants of Cambridgeshire
Lord-Lieutenants of the Tower Hamlets
Year of birth uncertain
English MPs 1661–1679
English MPs 1679
English MPs 1680–1681
English MPs 1681